This page is a list of cities and venues that have hosted the ABU Radio Song Festival, ABU TV Song Festival, and ABU International Dance Festival, one or more times. Future venues are shown in italics. The first venue in both the ABU Radio Song Festival 2012 and ABU TV Song Festival 2012, coincided with the 49th General Assembly of the Asia-Pacific Broadcasting Union.  The host cities of the ABU Radio Song Festivals from 2014 onwards are elected during ABU Administrative Council meetings.  Whereas the host cities of the ABU TV Song Festivals remain to coincide to take place in the host country of the ABU General Assembly meetings.

ABU Radio Song Festival 

Note 1:  Due to the demise of King Bhumibol Adulyadej, the 2017 ABU Radio Song Festival, initially scheduled to be held on 27 April 2017 as part of the 2017 RadioAsia Conference, was not to be held in Thailand. That festival was cancelled.

ABU TV Song Festival

ABU International Dance Festival

ABU Song Contest

See also 
 List of Eurovision Song Contest host cities
 List of Junior Eurovision Song Contest host cities

References

Host cities, list of
Host cities of the ABU Song Festivals
ABU Song Festivals